AFRINIC (African Network Information Centre) is the regional Internet registry (RIR) for Africa. Its headquarters are in Ebene, Mauritius.

Before AFRINIC was formed, IP addresses (IPv6 and IPv4) for Africa were distributed by the Asia-Pacific Network Information Centre (APNIC), the American Registry for Internet Numbers (ARIN), and the RIPE NCC. ICANN provisionally recognised AFRINIC on 11 October 2004. The registry became operational on 22 February 2005. ICANN gave it final recognition in April 2005.

Organisational structure

Board of Directors 
The AFRINIC Board consists of a nine-member Board of Directors. Six of the directors are elected to represent the different sub-regions, while two directors are elected to serve on the Board-based solely on competency as opposed to regional representation. The last seat on the Board is filled by the Chief Executive Officer.

Elections are held at each AFRNIC Annual General Meeting (AGMM), which is conducted around May/June every year. Voting takes place both on site at these meetings and prior to the meeting via online voting.

Council of Elders 
The AFRINIC Council of Elders consists of six former AFRINIC chairpersons.

They fulfill an advisory role and harness all their experience leading the organisation as former Chairs.

The Members of the AFRINIC Council of Elders are:
 Dr. Nii N. Quaynor  (AFRINIC Board of Trustees Chair: 2001–2004)
 Mr Pierre S. Dandjinou  (AFRINIC Chair: 2004–2008) Board Member: 2004-2010
 Dr. Viv Padayatchy (AFRINIC Chair: 2008–2011) - Board Member: - 2005-2011 
 Mrs Maimouna Ndeye Diop Diagne  (AFRINIC Chair: 2011–2012) - Board Member: 2010-2013

AFRINIC Staff 

AFRINIC staff carries out the daily operations of the organization.

The Staff is structured in nine departments: CEO's Office, HR and Administration, Research and Innovation, Finance and Accounting, External Relations, Communication and Public Relations, Member Services, IT and Engineering, and Capacity Building. These divisions encompass all AFRINIC activities, including that of acting as a central source of information for Members.

AFRINIC's open policy development process also invites stakeholders interested in Internet number resources from around the world (but mostly the African region) to participate. These include representatives from governments, regulators, educators, media, the technical community, civil society, and other not-for-profit organisations.

Public Policy Meeting 
Each year, AFRINIC conducts two public policy meetings. These give the community the chance to come together for policy development, information sharing, and networking. The first Public Policy Meeting of each year is known as the Africa Internet Summit (AIS), and the second is held as a standalone meeting. The meetings are held in various locations throughout Africa.

Controversies and scandals 

AFRINIC has been at the center of a number of organizational controversies in the past five years.

Corruption 

A former senior management member from AFRINIC, Ernest Byaruhanga, committed what is tagged to be Africa's greatest internet heist. In total, 4.1 million IP addresses were stolen. 2.3 million came from AFRINIC's “free pool” and a further 1.7 million were “legacy” IP addresses. They were worth around $87M, according to MyBroadband. IPv4 addresses, which were already reserved and in use by major organizations were effectively hijacked and sold. These reappropriated IP addresses were used to forward spam, breach data records, and compromise functioning websites. Dozens of South African-based companies and businesses were impacted. Education sectors and the Department of Defence were also hit, losing addresses worth approximately $5.3M.

Sexual harassment 

In March 2018, a sexual harassment complaint was filed by the RIR's former head of external relations, Vymala Poligadu. She alleged that she had been sexually harassed by Afrinic's former chair Sunday Folayan, former vice-chair Hytham El-Nakhal and former finance director Patrisse Deesse. She also alleged that they had been actively plotting to get her fired from her position.
The internal report detailing Poligadu's accusations was then leaked onto the organization's discussion mailing list by an anonymous poster, writing in response to a complaint by another member about high staff turnover.

Sunday Folayan and Haitham El Nakhal quit after the victim filed the complaint detailing the toxic and unprofessional work environment in AFRINIC, while stating that she is just one of many female staff who are harassed and intimidated daily by the AFRINIC male staff. Instead of conducting an investigation, AFRINIC covered up the scandal by not addressing the text messages pestering the now-departed AFRINIC female staffer, and has announced that there had been no evidence of harassment, bullying or intimidation on the part of certain members of the board.

Lawsuits

Lawsuit due to senior management's corruption

Afri Holdings Ltd & Others vs AFRINIC
In June 2020, AFRINIC was taken to court by one of the men whose name and company has been linked to the heist of the African Internet resources committed by a founding member of AFRINIC, Ernest Byaruhanga. In a notice sent to individuals and organisations that hold IP addresses in the African region, the current AFRINIC CEO Eddy Kayihura stated that an application for an interim injunction against AFRINIC was brought before the Commercial Division of the Supreme Court of Mauritius.
The application was lodged by Afri Holdings Ltd, Netstyle A. Ltd, and Elad Cohen. Internet investigator Ron Guilmette has linked Netstyle and Cohen's e-mail address to suspicious activity in South Africa, caused by large chunks of South African Internet Protocol address space, worth millions of dollars on the open reseller market, being stolen by AFRINIC's ex top senior executive Ernest Byaruhanga.
Affected IP addresses include a block that belongs to Sasol, and blocks which appear to belong to Tredcor, Afrox, Woolworths, and SITA. Documents obtained in August 2019 also showed that Cohen is a director and shareholder of Afri Holdings Ltd.

Logic Web Inc vs AFRINIC
On 1 October 2021, Logic Web Inc initiated an application for an interim injunction against AFRINIC.
LogicWeb Inc has received a 196.52.0.0/14 block under the registered  name of "ITC", which is a made-up name for a fake corporate entity that never existed, and one that was invented by the ex AFRINIC senior management Ernest Byaruhanga as a WHOIS cover story for his IP addresses famous heist. The 196.52.0.0/14 block was another one of AFRINIC's senior management's thefts from the free pool, and one that was subsequently sold or gifted to the proprietor of LogicWeb, Inc. of New York, USA, i.e. a certain Mr. Chad Abizeid. Some time after Mr Chad Abizeid received the 196.52.0.0/14 block that was stolen by Ernest Byaruhanga, which is worth well over $5 million USD, Mr. Abizeid tried to sell off the entire thing at once.
Before recently reclaiming the stolen Internet Resources, the ex-CEO AFRINIC Ceo, Eddy Kayihura, has known about the misappropriated 196.52.0.0/14 block for quite some time without taking any actions of reclaming it, in potential with corruption from Mr Abizeid, similar to the AfriHoldings lawsuit case.

AFRINIC's scandal of committing the biggest Internet Resources heist, valued at more than 50 million dollars, is still affecting businesses operations that are struggling to recover from AFRINIC's attempts of concealing the gravity of the thefts by reclaiming the stolen IP resources, with little to no consideration of the consequences on the African Internet Connectivity. These businesses  are now taking the matter to the Mauritius Courts by filing lawsuits against AFRINIC's management.

Lawsuit due to legal dispute with its membership

Cloud Innovation Ltd vs AFRINIC
Afrinic has been in a feud with Cloud Innovation (CI) since July 2021, as it intended to revoke over 6 million IP addresses from the company backing the claim by stating a breach in policy. However, Afrinic's attempt to seize IP addresses currently under Cloud Innovation's domain backfired, as by bringing the issue directly to court, without an effort to de-escalate the matter, the RIR did not follow its own in-house policies.

As a result of the unfounded claims advanced by Afrinic, the Supreme Court of Mauritius ordered that Afrinic bank accounts be frozen, thereby crippling its operations. On July 15, due to court order, Afrinic restored CI's IP address blocks. Yet, the RIR's bank assets remained frozen until October 15, when they were granted the removal of the freezing order against AFRINIC in the Mauritius Court. The litigation is still ongoing.

With the amount of IP addresses involved and Cloud Innovation's large international customer base, this ligation is said to be potentially impacting a large majority of the Internet's connectivity and operations. Internet professionals all over the world have raised concerns about the possible consequences that would result from Cloud Innovation's membership being possibly terminated.

As of date, Cloud Innovation has won in court against AFRINIC, with a Supreme Court Judge ruling in favour of the plaintiff, CI, and against AFRINIC. The Supreme Court Judge concluded that the lawsuits were caused by the registry’s dogged “determination… to terminate (the plaintiff’s) membership.” At the same time, the judge found no evidence of the lawsuits being indeed vexatious, asking how “in these circumstances… can it be held against the applicant […] that it resorted to the court to preserve its rights?”

Africa on Cloud (PTY) Ltd v Afrinic 
An Injunction has been issued against AFRINIC's board's illegal attempt to extend Director's term,In particular, board seat number 6 is currently being held by Abdalla Omari.  .This seat was given to Mr. Omari through the passing of an illegal resolution to extend a board member's office without an election, which is unprecedented and violate all democratic process meant to be respected in the community.

Crystal Web (Pty) Ltd v AFRINIC 
An order has been granted to Crystal Web, one of resources member of AFRINIC, to suspend the CEO of AFRINIC, Kayihura Mabano Eddy, right after he try to censor the community discussion list of AFRINIC because a resource member had uncovered disturbing information linking the CEO with a known terrorist supporter, Furthermore, Eddy has been the subject of many controversial and corruptions allegations over the short 2 years since he was in the office,. During his tenure as CEO, the lawsuits against AFRINIC have grown from 0 to near 50, with AFRINIC having been sued by over 8 different parties including himself.

Lawsuit by suspended CEO Kayihura Mabano Eddy against AFRINIC
Eddy knowing his term was expiring in a few months and the democratic elected new board will very unlikely to re-appoint him as CEO, tried one more desperate attempt to hold unto power, he has tried to bypass member-based elections by asking governmental body ATU to appoint directors though the court, thereby violating the bottom-up process in which the RIR is built on and destroying the effect former members and CEO have put in place for decades to prevent government interference in the internet self-governance model.

Interfere with rule of law and its home nation's sovereignty
Knowing AFRINIC will most likely lose its lawsuit against Cloud Innovation, AFRINIC requested four other RIRs to send a letter in the name of Number resources organization (NRO). This letter was sent to the Mauritius government requesting government interference with the juridical process for AFRINIC to win. They also wanted AFRINIC granted immunity to protect it from its own unlawful actions.

This letter was not received well by the global community, and Sander Steffan, one of the NRO's number council members, described such a move as "neo-colonialism".

A formal board member of AFRINIC, CTO of Liquid lab, also sent a letter to the Mauritius government requesting that they not act on the NRO letter by stating "please disregard it in its entirety and that the legal process be allowed to play out as per the Mauritian legal system".

International media at large has also been against this letter with one media personality calling it "causing collateral damage". Another referenced such action as a top-down approach (contradicting to bottom-up approach RIR was founded on) and questioned why RIR resisted the ITU proposal to take them over in the immunity is what they want.

On the other hand, the four CEOs who signed the letter are currently subject to potential criminal defamation claims. They called Cloud Innovation a vexatious litigant in their letter, and a week later a judgment from the supreme court was delivered, to specifically clear Cloud Innovation is not a vexatious litigant but rather criticized AFRINIC for trying to pervert the course of justice.

IPv4 exhaustion 
In April 2017, AFRINIC became the last regional Internet registry to run down to its last /8 block of IPv4 addresses (102/8), thus triggering the final phase of its IPv4 exhaustion policy. As a result, AFRINIC then implemented a soft landing policy for allocating the last /8 to its users, in which, since Phase 2 of the exhaustion period (started in January 2020), each AFRINIC customer is eligible for just one final maximum allocation of a /22 block of IPv4 addresses until the block is exhausted.

AFRINIC training 
AFRINIC conducts a number of training courses in a wide variety of locations around the region. These courses are designed to educate participants to proficiently configure, manage and administer their Internet services and infrastructure and to embrace current best practices.

WHOIS database 
The AFRINIC WHOIS Database contains registration details of IP addresses and AS numbers originally allocated by AFRINIC. It shows the organisations that hold the resources, where the allocations were made, and contact details for the networks. The organisations that hold those resources are responsible for updating their information in the database. The database can be searched by using the web interface on the AFRINIC site or by directing your whois client to whois.afrinic.net (for example, whois -h whois.afrinic.net 196.1.0.0/24).

The AFRINIC membership 
Major Internet Service Providers (ISPs), Internet exchange point (IXPs), governments and academic institutions.

Policy development process 
AFRINIC's policies are developed by the membership and broader Internet community. The major media for policy development are the face-to-face Public Policy Meetings, which are held twice each year, and mailing list discussions.

Economies 
AFRINIC's service region is divided into six sub-regions in Africa for statistic gathering purposes and for Board of Directors elections to ensure regional representation.

These sub-regions are: Northern, Western, Central, Eastern, Southern and the Indian Ocean.

AFRINIC's service region also includes several islands located in the Atlantic Ocean which are listed in the Western or Central African regions.

See also 

 Address Supporting Organization (ASO)
 Internet Governance Forum (IGF)
 Number Resource Organization (NRO): an organization of the five RIRs
 World Summit on the Information Society (WSIS)

References

External links 
 AFRINIC website
 AFRINIC Meetings archive

Internet in Africa
Regional Internet registries
Internet exchange points in Africa
Internet Assigned Numbers Authority
Ebene, Mauritius